The 2002 Russian Indoor Athletics Championships was the 11th edition of the national championship in indoor track and field for Russia. It was held on 12–14 February at the VGAFK Stadium in Volgograd. A total of 28 events (14 for men and 14 for women) were contested over the three-day competition. It was used for selection of the Russian team for the 2002 European Athletics Indoor Championships.

Two indoor events were contested in Moscow, separately from the main championships. An indoor 6-hour run was held on 1–2 February and the combined events were held from 3–5 February.

Natalya Cherepanova set a world indoor best for the women's 3000 metres steeplechase with 9:38.30. Vyacheslav Shabunin set a championship record of 3:40.88 to win the men's 1500 metres. Yekaterina Puzanova won an 800 metres/1500 m double on the women's side. Sergey Ivanov broke the championship record with a time of 7:57.53 minutes in the men's 3000 metres.

Results

Men

 On July 30, 2002, the IAAF in its monthly newsletter announced the disqualification of Russian hurdler Evgeny Pechonkin for 2 years. In his doping sample, taken as part of out-of-competition control on February 10, 2002, the prohibited drug norandrosterone was found. In accordance with the rules, all the athlete's results from the moment of sampling were annulled, including his win at the Russian Indoor Championship with a result of 7.63.

Women

Russian 6-Hour Run Indoor Championships

The Russian 6-Hour Run Indoor Championships was held over 1–2 February in Moscow at the Krylatskoye Sports Complex Velodrome. The competition was held as part of the second Moscow Night Supermarathon. 42 athletes (30 men and 12 women) from 16 regions of the country started the race. Aleksey Belosludtsev and Marina Bychkova set new Russian records of 91,017 metres and 74,475 metres, respectively.

Men

Women

Russian Combined Events Indoor Championships
The Russian Combined Events Indoor Championships was held from 3 to 5 February at the Znamensky Brothers Olympic Center in Moscow.

Men

Women

International team selection
As a result of the championships, the following athletes were selected for Russia at the 2002 European Athletics Indoor Championships:

Men
60 m: Ilya Levin
200 m: Denis Busovikov, Aleksandr Makukha
400 m: Dmitry Golovastov, Aleksandr Usov, Yevgeniy Lebedev
4 × 400 m relay: Dmitry Golovastov, Aleksandr Usov, Yevgeniy Lebedev, Aleksandr Ladeyshchikov, Oleg Mishukov
800 m: Dmitry Bogdanov, Sergey Kozhevnikov
1500 m: Vyacheslav Shabunin, Andrey Zadorozhniy
3000 m: Sergey Ivanov
60 m hurdles: Evgeny Pechonkin
High jump: Pavel Fomenko, Pyotr Brayko, Yaroslav Rybakov
Pole vault: Yuriy Yeliseyev, Yevgeniy Mikhaylichenko, Pavel Gerasimov
Long jump: Vitaliy Shkurlatov, Kirill Sosunov, Danil Burkenja‡
Triple jump: Aleksandr Sergeyev†, Igor Spasovkhodskiy, Aleksandr Aseledchenko
Shot put: Pavel Chumachenko, Ivan Yushkov.

Women
60 m: Larisa Kruglova, Marina Kislova, Yuliya Tabakova
200 m: Yuliya Tabakova, Svetlana Goncharenko‡, Olga Khalandyreva
400 m: Natalya Antyukh, Yuliya Pechonkina, Natalya Ivanova
800 m: Svetlana Cherkasova
1500 m: Olga Komyagina†, Yekaterina Puzanova, Yuliya Kosenkova
3000 m: Yelena Zadorozhnaya, Liliya Volkova, Oksana Belyakova
60 m hurdles: Svetlana Laukhova, Mariya Koroteyeva
High jump: Marina Kuptsova†, Yelena Sivushenko, Viktorija Seregina
Pole vault: Svetlana Feofanova†, Yelena Belyakova
Long jump: Olga Rublyova, Lyudmila Galkina, Irina Simagina
Triple jump: Nadezhda Bazhenova, Irina Vasilyeva, Yelena Oleynikova
Shot put: Lyudmila Sechko
Pentathlon: Yelena Prokhorova†

† Had exemption for selection and allowed not to compete at the national championships

‡ Later withdrew from the international competition

References

Results

Russian Indoor Athletics Championships
Russian Indoor Athletics Championships
Russian Indoor Athletics Championships
Russian Indoor Athletics Championships
Sports competitions in Volgograd